İlyas Ümer oğlu Tarhan (1900 – 17 April 1938) was a Soviet Crimean Tatar journalist, playwright, and politician who served as Chairman of the Central Executive Committee of the Crimean ASSR from 1931 to 1937. He was also an editor of the Yaş Quvet newspaper and a member of the Union of Soviet Writers. Arrested during the Great Purge and charged with involvement in a Pan-Turkic counterrevolutionary organisation, he was executed in 1937 and rehabilitated in 1956.

Early life and career 
İlyas Ümer oğlu Tarhan was born in 1900 in the village of Körbekül, under the Russian Empire. His father was a landless farmer. From 1913 to 1917, he lived in the city of Kazan, studying at a Tatar school in the city. He graduated from the Zincirli Madrasa, and joined the Russian Communist Party (Bolshevik) in 1919. During the Russian Civil War, he was involved in partisan activities against the White movement in South Russia before supporting the communist underground in Turkey and being arrested. Afterwards, Tarhan returned to Crimea and joined the Komsomol, becoming its leader in Crimea.

Career 
From 1921 to 1925, Tarhan worked as the editor of the youth newspaper Yaş Quvet. Afterwards, he began working as a member of the Communist Party in Sudak and Bakhchysarai. In this capacity, he participated in the persecution of both Veli İbraimov, Chairman of the Central Executive Committee of the Crimean ASSR, and Mamut Nadim, People's Commissar for Education.

On 20 February 1931, Tarhan became Chairman of the Central Executive Committee of the Crimean ASSR. Alongside his political career, he worked as a playwright, with Ucüm and Moskva ayta premiering at cities across the Soviet Union in 1932 and 1934, respectively. On his initiative, the Crimean State Tatar Drama Theatre began construction in 1933. In 1934, he joined the Union of Soviet Writers, also becoming head of the Union of Crimean Writers. He also briefly worked as editor of the Crimean Tatar magazine of the regional committee, Bolşevik Yölu.

Execution 
The arrests of Tarhan, Samedinov, and Çagar served as a basis for an anti-Crimean Tatar campaign as part of the Great Purge. On 17 April 1938, during a court session, he retracted previous coerced concessions and pled not guilty. That day, he was sentenced to death, and executed the same day. Following his death, his property was confiscated by the Soviet government.

On 24 November 1956, Tarhan was posthumously rehabilitated by the Soviet government, with the statement on his rehabilitation reading, "Within the Crimean NKVD, where the investigation into the Tarhan case was conducted, from 1937 to 1938 unreasonable arrests, beatings of those arrested, falsification of investigative materials, and other gross violations of the law were allowed."

References 

1900 births
1938 deaths
Communist Party of the Soviet Union members
Crimean Tatar journalists
Crimean Tatar people executed by the Soviet Union
Crimean Tatar politicians
Crimean Tatar writers
Great Purge victims from Ukraine
Members of the Communist Party of the Soviet Union executed by the Soviet Union
People from Yaltinsky Uyezd